Shahid Ali may refer to:

Agha Shahid Ali (1949–2001), Indian American poet
Shahid Ali Khan (field hockey) (born 1964), Pakistan field hockey player
Shahid Ali Khan (singer), Canada based singer in the Qawwali genre
Shahid Ali Khan (politician) (fl. 2005–2016), Indian politician
Shahed Ali Patwary (1899–1958), Deputy Speaker of East Pakistan Assembly

See also
Shahid Ali Khan (disambiguation)